The Singing Contest of Icelandic Junior Colleges (Söngkeppni framhaldsskólanna) is a yearly competition that has been held since 1990 on behalf of "The Icelandic Upper Secondary School Student Union".  Each year, a preliminary competition is held in each college and then representatives from each school compete on the final evening of the main competition.  The singing contest is usually held before the end of the school year.

No one school has monopolized the competition, which is not the case in some of the other college competitions.

The list of Winners starting from the first competition
1990 – Fjölbrautaskóli Suðurlands
Performer: Lárus Ingi Magnússon
Song: Eltu mig uppi (Sálin hans Jóns míns)
2nd place: Móeiður Júníusdóttir, MR
3rd place: Páll Óskar Hjálmtýsson, MH
1991 – Flensborgarskólinn í Hafnarfirði
Performer: Margrét Eir Hjartardóttir
Song: Glugginn
2nd place: Hera Björk Þórhallsdóttir, FB
3rd place: Ottó Tynes, MS
1992 – Menntaskólinn í Reykjavík
Performer: Margrét Sigurðardóttir
Song: Látúnsbarkinn (Stuðmenn)
1993 – Menntaskólinn í Reykjavík
Performer: Þóranna Jónbjörnsdóttir
Song: Dimmar rósir
1994 – Menntaskólinn í Kópavogi
Performer: Emilíana Torrini
Song: I Will Survive
2nd place: Flensborgardætur Berglind Helga Sigurþórsdóttir, Katrín Ósk Einarsdóttir, Sigrún Pálmadóttir
3rd place:
1995 – Fjölbrautaskóli Norðurlands vestra
Performer: Hrafnhildur Ýr Víglundsdóttir
Song: Wind Beneath My Wings
2nd place: Sara Guðmundsdóttir, Flensborg
3rd place: Svavar Knútur Kristinsson, MH
1996 – Menntaskólinn í Kópavogi
Performer: Þórey Heiðdal Vilhjálmsdóttir
Song: Hetja/ Hero (Mariah Carey)
2nd place: Regína Ósk, MH
3rd place:Jón Jósep Snæbjörnsson, MA
1997 – Menntaskólinn við Hamrahlíð (Hamrahlid College)
Performer: Haukur Halldórsson and Flóki Guðmundsson (Limó duet)
Lag: Harmleikur/Tragedy (Bee Gees)
2nd place: MK
3rd place: Harpa Heiðarssdóttir MA
1998 – Menntaskólinn við Hamrahlíð (Hamrahlid College)
Performers: Aðalsteinn Bergdal, Davíð Olgeirsson, Kristbjörn Helgason, Orri Páll Jóhannsson and Viktor Már Bjarnason (Brooklyn fæv)
Song: Óralanga leið/For the Longest Time (Billy Joel)
2nd place:
3rd place:
1999 – Flensborgarskólinn í Hafnarfirði
Performer: Guðrún Árný Karlsdóttir
Song: To Love You More (Celine Dion)
2nd place: Þorvaldur Þorvaldsson, Menntaskólinn við Sund
3rd place: Arnbjörg Ösp Matthíasdóttir, Lára Bryndís Eggertsdóttir, Lovísa Árnadóttir and Sigríður Rafnar Pétursdóttir (Djúsí-systur), Menntaskólinn í Reykjavík
2000 – Fjölbrautaskóli Norðurlands vestra
Performer: Sverrir Bergmann
Song: Always (Bon Jovi)
2nd place: Jóhannes Haukur Jóhannesson, Flensborg
3rd place: Helgi Valur Ásgeirsson, Fjölbrautarskóla Suðurlands
2001 – Flensborgarskólinn í Hafnarfirði
Performer: Arnar Þór Viðarsson
Song: Þakklæti/To be Grateful (Trúbrot)
2nd place:
3rd place:
2002 – Fjölbrautaskóli Norðurlands vestra
Performer: Eva Karlotta Einarsdóttir & the Sheep River Hooks
Song: (Original Song – title needed)
2nd place: Eva Dögg Sveinsdóttir Kvennaskólinn í Reykjavík
3rd place:
2003 – Menntaskólinn á Akureyri (Akureyri Junior College)
Performer: Anna Katrín Guðbrandsdóttir
Song: Vísur Vatnsenda-Rósu
Arrangement: Ólafur Haukur Árnason and Styrmir Hauksson
2nd place: Sigþór Árnason, Fjölbrautaskóli Suðurlands
3rd place: Elísabet Eyþórsdóttir, Borgarholtsskóli
Venue: Íþróttahöllin á Akureyri
2004 – Menntaskólinn við Hamrahlíð
Performers: Sunna Ingólfsdóttir and Sigurlaug Gísladóttir
Song: Green Eyes (Erykah Badu)
2nd place: Heimir Bjarni Ingimarsson, Verkmenntaskólinn á Akureyri
3rd place: Birgir Olgeirsson, Menntaskólinn á Ísafirði
2005 – Menntaskólinn í Reykjavík
Performer: Hrund Ósk Árnadóttir
Song: Sagan af Gunnu
2nd place: Dagný Elísa Halldórsdóttir, Verkmenntaskólinn á Akureyri
3rd place: Elísabet Ásta Bjarkadóttir, Fjölbrautaskóli Suðurlands
2006 – Fjölbrautaskóli Vesturlands
Performer: Helga Ingibjörg Guðjónsdóttir
Song: Ruby Tuesday (Rolling Stones)
2nd place: Menntaskólinn í Kópavogi
3rd place:
Sms kosning: Hann og Hún  – Brynjar Páll Rögnvaldsson – Helgi Sæmundur Guðmundsson – Hrund Jóhannsdóttir – Ragnheiður Silja Have Jónsdóttir
2007 – Verkmenntaskólinn á Akureyri
Performer: Eyþór Ingi Gunnlaugsson
Song: Framtíð bíður
2008 – Verzlunarskóli Íslands (Commercial College of Iceland)
Performer: Sigurður Þór Óskarsson
Song: The Professor (Damien Rice)
2nd place: Ingunn Kristjánsdóttir, Fjölbrautaskóla Norðurlands vestra
3rd place: Dagur Sigurðsson, Fjölbrautaskólanum við Ármúla
2009 – Fjölbrautarskóli Vesturlands
Performer: Kristín Þóra Jóhannsdóttir
Song: Einmanna sál (Angels – Robbie Williams)
2010 – Borgarholtsskóli
Performers: Kristmundur Axel and Júlí Heiðar
Song: Komdu til baka – (Tears in Heaven) along with an original rap
2nd place: Darri Rafn Hólmarsson and Rakel Sigurðardóttir, Menntaskólinn á Akureyri;
3rd place: Hallfríður Þóra Tryggvadóttir, Verzlunarskóli Íslands
2011 - Tækniskólinn
Performers: Dagur Sigurðsson
Song: Vitskert vera/Helter Skelter (The Beatles)
2nd place: Rakarasvið, Menntaskólinn við Sund
3rd place: Sabína Siv, Fjölbrautaskóli Suðurnesja
2012 - Tækniskólinn
Performers: Karlakór Sjómannaskólans
Song: Stolt siglir fleyið mitt (Gylfa Ægisson)
2nd place: Jóhann Freyr Óðinsson, Verkmenntaskólinn á Akureyri
3rd place: Rut Ragnarsdóttir og Ragnar Þór Jónsson, Framhaldsskólinn á Húsavík
2013 - Menntaskólinn við Hamrahlíð
Performers: Ásdís María Ingvarsdóttir og Oddur Ingi Kristjánsson
Song: Pink Matter (Frank Ocean)
2nd place: Þóra María Rögnvaldsdóttir, Fjölbrautarskólinn í Breiðholti
3rd place: Menntaskólinn á Laugarvatni
2014 - Tækniskólinn
Performers: Sara Pétursdóttir
Song: Make You Feel My Love (Bob Dylan)
2nd place: Menntaskólinn í Kópavogi
3rd place: Verslunarskóli Íslands
2015 - Menntaskólinn í Reykjavík
Performers: Karólína Jóhannsdóttir
Song: Go Slow (HAIM)
2nd place: Aron Hannes Emilsson, Borgarholtsskóla
3rd place: Saga Matthildur Árnadóttir, Fjölbrautaskólinn í Garðabæ
2016 - Menntaskólinn við Hamrahlíð
Performers: Náttsól (Elín Sif Halldórsdóttir, Guðrún Ólafsdóttir og Hranfhildur Magnea Ingólfsdóttir)
Song: Go Slow (HAIM)
2nd place: Jóna Alla Axelsdóttir og Ari Jónsson, Fjölbrautaskóli Vesturlands á Akranesi
3rd place: Guðbjörg Viðja Antonsdóttir, Aron Ýmir Antonsson, Elva Rún Pétursdóttir, Guðjón Andri Jóhannsson og Sigrún Birna Pétursdóttir, Menntaskólinn á Laugarvatni
2018 - Menntaskólinn á Akureyri
Performers: Birkir Blær Óðinsson
Song: I Put a Spell on You (Screamin’ Jay Hawkins)
Vinsælasta atriðið: Valdís Valbjörndóttir, Fjölbrautaskóli Norðurlands Vestra
2019 - Tækniskólinn
Performers: Aaron Ísak Berry
Song: Love of My Life (Queen)
2nd place: Anna Róshildur Benediktsdóttir, Menntaskólinn við Hamrahlíð
3rd place: Diljá Pétursdóttir, Verslunarskóli Íslands
Karlotta Ósk Sigurðardóttir won for the most beautiful singing in 2019.
2020 - Menntaskólinn á Tröllaskaga
Performers: Tryggvi Þorvaldsson, Hörður Ingi Kristjánsson, Júlíus Þorvaldsson og Mikael Sigurðsson
Song: I'm Gonna Find Another You (John Mayer)
2nd place: Dag­mar Lilja Óskars­dótt­ir, Framhaldsskólinn í Austur- Skaftafellssýslu
3rd place: Sig­ríður Halla Ei­ríks­dótt­ir, Menntaskólinn í Reykjavík
2021 - Menntaskólinn í Reykjavík
Performers: Jóhanna Björk Snorradóttir
Song: Distance (Yebba)
2nd place: Þorsteinn Helgi Kristjánsson, Fjölbrautaskóli Suðurnesja
3rd place: Rakel Björgvinsdóttir, Menntaskólinn í Tónlist

External links 
 Homepage of the "Singing Contest of the Icelandic Colleges"

Icelandic culture
Recurring events established in 1990
1990 establishments in Iceland
Education in Iceland